Nikola Simić may refer to:
 Nikola Simić (actor) (1934–2014), Serbian actor
 Nikola Simić (footballer, born 1897) (1897–1969), Serbian football player, manager and coach of the Yugoslav national
 Nikola Simić (footballer, born 1976), Croatian footballer
 Nikola Simić (footballer, born 1981), Serbian footballer
 Nikola Simić (footballer, born 1996), Serbian football goalkeeper